Francesco Raschini (born 9 June 1977) is an Italian professional darts player who currently plays in World Darts Federation (WDF) events. He is the first Italian player who played in the World Darts Championship.

Career
Raschini was only seen competing in the Italian Grand Masters from 2010 to 2016. His best result there is a quarter-finals in 2011. In 2016, he took part in the Malta Open, which he ended in the Last 32 phase. A few weeks later, he started in qualifying for the BDO World Darts Championship, organized a few days before the 2016 Winmau World Masters. In this tournament he lost in second round match to Bradley Kirk by 0–3 in sets.

Since 2019, Raschini has been seen at significantly more tournaments. So he registered for the PDC Q-School, but stayed far away from a tour card. In the following months, he also traveled to World Darts Federation tournaments throughout Europe and reached the Last 16 phase at the Helvetia Open and French Open. Raschini also participated at the 2019 World Masters and lost in the second round to Paul Hogan by 0–3 in sets. In 2020, he make a best results to date, achieved a semi-final in the Slovak Masters.

In 2021, he collected a lot of points, in particular by participating in the quarter-finals of the Hungarian Masters and reaching Last 32 phase at the Denmark Open and Irish Open. Raschini also increased his points account with the quarter-finals at the Slovenia Open, Catalonia Open, Italian Open and Italian Grand Masters, which allowed him to start in the 2022 WDF World Darts Championship. He made his Lakeside debut against Ryan de Vreede and lost 1–2 in sets.

In 2022, he took part in several international tournaments, but without much success. In June, he took part in the 2022 Dutch Open when he lost in the sixth round match to Arjan Konterman by 3–4 in legs.

World Championship results

WDF
 2022: First round (lost to Ryan de Vreede 1–2) (sets)

Performance timeline

References

1977 births
Living people
Italian darts players